The 1904–05 season was Stoke's 16th season in the Football League.

There was no relegation worries for Stoke this season due to the First Division being expanded to 20 clubs for the 1905–06 campaign. Stoke struggled for consistency and finished in a mid-table position of 12th after picking up 30 points.

Season review

League
The summer of 1904 saw a further exodus of players, including Arthur Capes who left for Bristol City and Leigh Richmond Roose who went to Everton. There was now a distinct lack of quality players available within the club and with these two major departures, the now despondent Stoke supporters saw very little hope of improvement out on the pitch. Tom Holford took over captaincy whilst Jack Whitley arrived as first choice 'keeper from Everton.

James Sheridan an Irish International forward also came in from Everton, but never fitted in at the Victoria Ground although he did win an Ireland cap whilst at Stoke becoming the clubs first capped Irishman. Jack Hall another recruit signed from Newark, in October 1904 and his seven goals were only exceeded by Fred Rouse who was top scorer with 12. Not being able to field a settled forward line was a major problem for manager Horace Austerberry and 12th place in the division was the final outcome in an inconsistent season.

FA Cup
Stoke went out of this season FA Cup in the second round after being well beaten 4–0 at home to Everton.

Final league table

Results
Stoke's score comes first

Legend

Football League First Division

FA Cup

Squad statistics

References

Stoke City F.C. seasons
Stoke